Spadix may refer to:
 Spadix (botany), a reproductive organ of some genera of plants
 Spadix (zoology), a similarly shaped secondary sexual organ of some genera of cephalopods and hydrozoans